The Great Eastern Trail is a network of hiking trails forming a long-distance route in the eastern United States. North of Georgia, the route runs parallel to, and slightly to the west of, the Appalachian Trail.

Description 
The Great Eastern Trail network mostly consists of previously existing long-distance trails that have been combined to form a multi-state network. Some new connectors between those trails remain to be developed. Hiking northbound, the network is projected to begin in Florida and to pass through Alabama, Georgia, Tennessee, Kentucky, West Virginia, Virginia, Maryland, and Pennsylvania, with its northern terminus at the North Country Trail in western New York State. Much of the route in Florida, Alabama, and Georgia will be shared with the Eastern Continental Trail network.

Upon its completion, the Great Eastern Trail is slated to be added to the US National Trails System. The project received support from the American Hiking Society and the Rivers, Trails, and Conservation Assistance Program of the US National Park Service, but then became an independent entity. The Great Eastern Trail Association was incorporated in Virginia on August 10, 2007, by signatories from the nine states through which the trail passes.

In June 2013 "Hillbilly" Bart Houck of Mullens, West Virginia and Joanna "Someday" Swanson of Willow River, Minnesota became the first to complete a thru-hike on the developed segments of the Great Eastern Trail network from Alabama to New York. In October 2016, Kathy Finch of New Hampshire became the first to complete a southbound thru-hike of the completed segments from New York to Alabama.

Trails in the network
The Great Eastern Trail will be incorporated into portions of the previously existing trails listed below; while several gaps remain to be filled. The list below follows the projected route from south to north.

 Florida Trail 
 Connector to be developed in the Florida panhandle and southern Alabama
 Pinhoti Trail in Alabama and Georgia
 Connector to be developed in northwestern Georgia and southeastern Tennessee
 Cumberland Trail in Tennessee (itself under development)
 Connector to be developed around the Tennessee/Kentucky state line
 Pine Mountain Trail in Kentucky (itself under development)
 Connector to be developed from eastern Kentucky to southwestern Virginia
 Brief concurrency with the Appalachian Trail in Virginia and West Virginia
 Allegheny Trail in West Virginia (itself under development)
 Connector to be developed in northeastern West Virginia
 Tuscarora Trail
 Standing Stone Trail
 Mid State Trail
 Finger Lakes Trail

References

External links
Great Eastern Trail - official website
Cumberland Trail
Journal of through hike

 
Hiking trails in Pennsylvania
Hiking trails in Maryland
Hiking trails in Virginia
Hiking trails in Tennessee
Hiking trails in Alabama
Hiking trails in Georgia (U.S. state)
Long-distance trails in the United States